Seung Jo Kim (born June 24, 1950) is a South Korean aerospace engineer. He has been the current President of Korea Aerospace Research Institute (KARI) since June 2011, where the most of the national aerospace systems like aircraft, satellites and rockets are developed. During his tenure, Kim led the development of smart Unmanned aerial vehicle (UAV), the launch of KOMPSAT-3 (Korea Multi-Purpose Satellite-3), KOMPSAT-5, STSat-3 (Science and Technology Satellite-3) and the first Korean space launch vehicle, Naro-1. Before becoming president of KARI, Kim had been a professor of the Engineering College at Seoul National University since 1986. He chaired the KSAS (Korean Society for Aeronautical and Space Sciences) in 2009, the KSCM (Korean Society for Composite Materials) from 2005 to 2006, and the KSIAM (Korean Society for Industrial and Applied Mathematics) from 2004 to 2008. He was also head of the New Aerospace Technology Research Institute from 2001 to 2003. Kim has been a fellow of the American Institute of Aeronautics and Astronautics (AIAA) since 2010 and the Institute of Physics since 2004.

Background 
Kim completed his bachelor's degree in the Department of Aerospace Engineering at Seoul National University in 1973. After graduation, he started his mandatory military service as a Republic of Korea Air Force officer specializing in aircraft maintenance. In 1974, he moved from that position to a military research organization, the Agency for Defense Development (ADD), and worked as an experimental aerodynamicist in the trisonic wind tunnel test facility at ADD. He continued working in ADD after his retirement from the Air Force until 1979. He was promoted to senior researcher with the development of the six component sting balance for the trisonic wind tunnel.

In 1979, he went to the University of Texas for graduate school. He finished M.S. (1981) and Ph.D. (1985) degrees on the finite element analysis of solids and structures, and Professor J. T. Oden was his supervisor. After seven months of post-doctoral work under Professor Oden, he came back to be an assistant professor at his alma mater, Seoul National University.

Academic career 
In the department of Aerospace Engineering of Seoul National University, from 1986 to 2011 Kim taught the mechanics of aircraft structures, nonlinear continuum mechanics and other subjects while doing research on the finite element methods, numerical analyses of composite structures, dynamics of helicopter rotor blades, optimal design of satellite structures, smart structures, and other fields. Kim also worked as the Departmental Chair of Aerospace Engineering and as Director of Engineering Computation Center for four years. He was the director of Institute of Advanced Aerospace Technologies in Seoul National University after making major contributions to create the institute.

He has been on the editorial boards of three international journals, Smart Materials and Structures by IOP Publishing, Computer Modeling in Engineering and Sciences, and Smart Structures and Systems. He has also served as the executive editor for the Journal of Korean Society for Aeronautical and Space Sciences (KSAS) for eight years. He had been serving as the president of the Korean Society of Composite Materials, Korea Unmanned Vehicle Systems Association, the Korean Society of Industrial, Applied Mathematics, and the KSAS.

Kim has served on many South Korean national committees for national research and development programs, especially in aerospace area for last twenty years. He had been a member of evaluation committees for the development of Scientific satellites, multipurpose Low Earth orbit (LEO) satellites, and rocket launch vehicles of the Ministry of Science and Technology as well as midsize passenger airplanes, high-altitude airships, Smart UAV, the Korean Helicopter Program, and small size airplanes.

Kim has published more than 240 papers in international journals and conferences and 320 papers in South Korean journals and conferences.  Kim has also applied for 5 patents including a patent related to vertical takeoff and landing aircraft.

Kim was chosen as the Distinguished Professor by the College of Engineering of Seoul National University in 2007 and the inaugural Seoul National University Academic Research Award as the only engineering college in 2008. He also received one of the best teaching awards in 2008.

Diamond / IPSAP 
Kim developed the general purpose parallel finite element code, IPSAP (Internet Parallel Structural Analysis Program) in the mid-1990s, which can be run efficiently not only on an ordinary SMP supercomputer but also in the distributed computing environment like clusters and PCs connected through the Internet. Due to these research achievements, his research team was designated as the National Research Laboratory (NRL) by the South Korean government. This designation awarded to him a five-year (1999~2004) commitment of about one million dollars for research on aerospace structures and materials. He carried out three more years (2006~2009) of NRL research after receiving one of the best evaluations on the achievement of his first five years of NRL research.

Since 2006, Kim has been distributing the developed code, IPSAP, to structural engineers around the world free of charge through the website:  https://web.archive.org/web/20081216044155/http://teragate.snu.ac.kr/ He also developed a GUI (Graphic User Interface), DIAMOND, as Pre-Post Processor for the IPSAP. It is also being distributed as free software.

These activities attracted Microsoft and he was able to have a 3-year research contract with Microsoft under the title of "Development of High Performance/Friendlier FE Software IPSAP for Windows Cluster OS". Related to this work, he also received "Leadership Award for Technical Computing" from Microsoft in March 2007.

Cluster Super-Computer, PEGASUS 
Kim led the Seoul National University's conclusion of a Memorandum of understanding (MOU) on developing a high performance super-computer with Microsoft, Intel and Samsung Electronics in 2002. Based on this MOU, a 1 Tera flop super-computer, PEGASUS was developed in November 2002. PEGASUS is composed of 520 CPUs and 260 calculation nodes. It was 56th highest performance super-computer in the world at that time.

Cyclocopter 
Since 2000, Kim has been doing research on the cyclocopter with 4 rotors. In 2012, he held an outdoor flight demonstration of the cyclocopter for the first time in the world. The cyclocopter is a new VTOL (Vertical Take-Off and Landing) air vehicle that employs a unique propulsion system of cycloidal blades to generate the propulsion and lift for a VTOL maneuver. The rotor system consists of several blades rotating about a horizontal axis that is perpendicular to the direction of normal flight. The cycloidal propeller offers powerful thrust levels, and a unique ability to change the direction of the thrust almost instantly.

KARI president 
Since his inauguration in 2011 as KARI president, Kim has led the successes of the national aerospace R&D programs such as Naro, KOMPSAT-3 and 5, STSat-3 and Smart UAV with leadership and scientific and technological competence. Kim also constructed the foundation of aerospace technology growth and contributed to the enhancement of national science and technology development.

KOMPSAT-3 
Kim was the leader of the planning research on the KOMPSAT-3. Kim led the final development, launch, and early operation of the KOMPSAT-3 which was launched on 18 May 2012. The KOMPSAT-3 is a high resolution Earth observation satellite equipped with a 0.7m resolution optical camera in order to fulfill the national demand for sub-metric resolution satellite imagery. KOMPSAT-3 was developed independently from design to final assembly. With KOMPSAT-3, South Korea became the fourth country to have a sub-metric resolution satellite.

Smart UAV 
Kim participated in setting up the organization of the smart UAV development program which was started in July 2002 as one of the Frontier R&D Programs supported by the South Korean government. After his inauguration, Kim led the completion of transition flight and test flew the smart UAV. Thus, South Korea became the second country which indigenously developed the core technologies for tilt-rotor aircraft. With the Smart UAV program KARI acquired original technologies of future PAV (Personal Aerial Vehicle) and is now working with industries to put the tilt-rotor UAV system to practical uses and to generate subsequent programs for production.

Korea Space Launch Vehicle, Naro 
KARI has been developing South Korea's first space launch vehicle KSLV-I or Naro-1, since 2002 to deliver a 100 kg-class satellite into a low Earth orbit. Kim was a member of the advisory committee of Naro development and a member of the accident investigation board after the failure of the first Naro launch. After his inauguration, Kim played a leading role in investigating the causes of launch delays and solved related problems. Eventually, Naro-1 was successfully launched on 30 January 2013.

Now Kim is guiding the development of the KSLV-II or Nuri which can put a 1500 kg-class application satellite into a 600~800 km Sun-synchronous orbit on the basis of the technical achievements and experiences of KSLV-I. Kim hopes that the KSLV program will be a cornerstone for South Korea's entrance into the global launch service market.

KOMPSAT-5 
Kim completed the launch (22 August 2013) of the KOMPSAT-5 which is equipped with a Synthetic-aperture radar (SAR) instrument. KOMPSAT-5 is being operated at a mean altitude of 550 km in a Sun-synchronous orbit and will conduct all weather and all day observation of the Earth during its five-year mission period.

STSat-3 
The STSat-3 project was initiated in December 2006 and the flight model of the STSat-3 was launched into a Sun-synchronous orbit at a nominal altitude of 600 km on 21 November 2013. Kim led the final development of the STSat-3 whose mass is about 170 kg. The STSat-3 carried an infrared (IR) camera for space observation and an imaging spectrometer for earth observation. STSat-3 will analyze near-infrared radiation from space, observe the atmosphere of the Earth and detect forest fires during its 2-year mission lifetime.

KARI Satellite Design System (KSDS) 
Kim has been leading the development of KSDS since August 2012 in order to increase the efficiency of satellite design and analysis along with reducing development cost and time. The KSDS is capable of performing solar cell degradation, AOCS (Attitude and Orbit Control Subsystem) disturbance, thermal, radiation, link budget, power budget, radiation dose, and contamination analysis. These solvers are all integrated into a framework providing user-friendly pre-post processing. The KSDS thermal analysis is based on the finite element method and has functions of importing and post-processing the structure model of NASTRAN and IPSAP. KSDS will be a useful tool in not only designing satellites, but also educating future space engineers in South Korea.

Awards 
 2001 Gordon Bell Prize (SC2001, Denver, Colorado, United States)
 2004 Fellow, Institute of Physics, United Kingdom
 2007 Leadership Award for Technical Computing, Microsoft
 2008 The Research Award of Seoul National University
 2010 Fellow, American Institute of Aeronautics and Astronautics
 2013 Medal of Innovation in Science by the South Korean government
 2013 '21st Century Award of the Year' in Science & Technology

External links 

 Aerospace Structures Laboratory
 Seoul National University homepage
 Korea Aerospace Research Institute homepage

1950 births
Living people
Seoul National University alumni
South Korean engineers